Nebraska Highway 27 is a highway in Nebraska.  It is divided into three segments. The southernmost segment begins at the Kansas border and goes north to Haigler.  The middle segment begins at Interstate 80 near Chappell and goes north to Oshkosh.  The northernmost segment begins at Ellsworth and goes north to the South Dakota border.

Route description

Southern segment
The southern segment of Nebraska Highway 27 begins at the Kansas border.  The southern terminus of NE 27 is also the northern terminus of K-27.  It goes north  through farm fields to Haigler, where it intersects U.S. Highway 34 and ends.

Middle segment
The middle segment of Nebraska Highway 27 begins at Interstate 80 at Exit 95 near Chappell. It goes north through farmland to U.S. Highway 30. At Oshkosh, NE 27 meets U.S. Highway 26 and the middle segment ends.

Northern segment
The northern segment of Nebraska Highway 27 begins at Nebraska Highway 2 at Ellsworth.  It goes north through the Sand Hills to Gordon, where it intersects U.S. Highway 20.  It continues north out of Gordon and ends at the South Dakota border. The roadway continues in South Dakota as South Dakota Highway 391.

The segment of Nebraska Highway 27 between Ellsworth and Gordon runs through cattle range of the famous Spade Ranch and passes notable Nebraska writer Mari Sandoz home and gravesite.

Major intersections

Southern segment

Middle segment

Northern segment

References

External links

Nebraska Roads: NE 21-40

027
Transportation in Dundy County, Nebraska
Transportation in Deuel County, Nebraska
Transportation in Garden County, Nebraska
Transportation in Sheridan County, Nebraska